Osceola, Nevada, is a ghost town in the eastern part of the U.S. state of Nevada. The town was a placer camp devoted to mining gold. Gold was first discovered in 1872, followed by exploitation of the deposits using hydraulic mining techniques. Two ditches, the Osceola West Ditch and the Osceola East Ditch were built to convey water from the mountains for use in mining. Water production was less than hoped and hydraulic mining ceased in 1900, when the population had declined from 1500 at its peak to 100. A fire in the 1940s destroyed much of the town, but a few buildings and a cemetery remain.

The town is just to the west of Great Basin National Park. Some small-scale mining activities continue.

References

External links
 Osceola, Nevada at Great Basin National Heritage Route
 Osceola Ditch at Great Basin National Park

Ghost towns in White Pine County, Nevada
Populated places established in 1872
1872 establishments in Nevada
Ghost towns in Nevada
Great Basin National Heritage Area